Evaz Beg Ustajlu was a Turkoman military officer from the Ustajlu tribe, who briefly served as the Safavid governor of Bitlis (Bedlis, also spelled Betlis) in 1514. He was a son of Mirza Beg Ustajlu and had three brothers; Mohammad Khan Ustajlu, Owlash Beg Ustajlu and Qara Beg Ustajlu.

Sources
  

15th-century births
16th-century deaths
History of Bitlis
Safavid governors
Iranian Turkmen people
Ustajlu
Safavid military officers
16th-century people of Safavid Iran